La Consolacion College may refer to the following schools owned and administered by the Association of Schools of the Augustinian Sisters of Our Lady of Consolation:

Philippines
La Consolacion University Philippines, in Malolos City, Bulacan
La Consolacion College Manila, in Manila
La Consolacion College Bacolod, in Bacolod City
La Consolacion College Baao, in Baao, Camarines Sur
La Consolacion College Biñan, in Biñan City, Laguna
La Consolacion College Daet, in Daet, Camarines Norte
La Consolacion College Iriga, in Iriga City, Camarines Sur
La Consolacion College – Novaliches, in Deparo, Novaliches, Caloocan
La Consolacion College Caloocan, in Dagat-Dagatan, Caloocan
La Consolacion College Bais, in Bais City, Negros Oriental
La Consolacion College La Carlota, in La Carlota City, Negros Occidental
La Consolacion College Liloan, in Liloan, Cebu
La Consolacion College Murcia, in Murcia, Negros Occidental
La Consolacion College Pasig, in Pasig
La Consolacion College Tanauan, in Tanauan City, Batangas
La Consolacion College Valenzuela, in St. Jude Subdivision, Malinta, Valenzuela City
La Consolacion College Isabela, in Isabela, Negros Occidental
La Consolacion School of Balagtas, in Balagtas, Bulacan
La Consolacion School – Gardenville, in Tangub, Bacolod City